Sachiko Morimura (born 28 January 1972) is a Japanese gymnast. She competed in six events at the 1988 Summer Olympics.

References

1972 births
Living people
Japanese female artistic gymnasts
Olympic gymnasts of Japan
Gymnasts at the 1988 Summer Olympics
Place of birth missing (living people)